Readerlink Distribution Services, is a publisher and distributor of books based in Oak Brook, Illinois. Readerlink is the largest distributor of books to mass merchandisers in United States, and the largest distributor of hardcover, trade and paperback books to non-trade channel booksellers in North America. Servicing approximately 66,000 storefronts in the United States, Readerlink distributes approximately one out of every three consumer trade books sold in the country. 
 As of 2016, the company has distribution centers in Clearfield, Utah; Denton, Texas; Romeoville, Illinois; Salem, Virginia; and Winder, Georgia. Dennis E. Abboud serves as Readerlink's President and CEO.

Recent Events

 In 2014, Readerlink acquired the retail book business of TNG GP. Likewise, Readerlink's field merchandising services unit was spun into TNG's remaining operation.
 In 2015, Readerlink significantly expanded its role in the book publishing and distribution business by acquiring the North Carolina-based book distributor firm of Baker and Taylor's (B&T's) publishing group and U.S. marketing services. The acquisition included B&T's publishing operations for Silver Dolphin Books, Thunder Bay Press, Portable Press, and Canterbury Classics. Those imprints, which collectively publish about 500 titles annually, will be continued by Readerlink.
 In 2016, Readerlink acquired the retail book distribution business of ANConnect.
 In 2016, Readerlink acquired Studio Fun International, formerly Reader's Digest Children's Publishing, from Trusted Media Brands, Inc.
 In 2020, Readerlink acquired the activity book publisher Dreamtivity.
 In 2022, Readerlink became the US distributor for British publisher Canelo

References

External links 
 Readerlink Distribution Services - official site
 Printers Row Publishing Group website
 Portable Press website

Companies based in DuPage County, Illinois
Book distributors